Carl Runk is an American former college lacrosse and college football coach at Towson University in Towson, Maryland, with over 30 years of combined coaching experience. He was the Tigers' first-ever head football coach, which he coached from 1969 to 1971. He is perhaps best known for his coaching success with Towson's lacrosse program, however.

Early life
Runk graduated from the University of Arizona where he played on the Arizona Wildcats football team. He then began coaching the men's lacrosse team at Arizona throughout the 1960s. After bringing the Arizona program to consistent success, Runk went to Towson University (then Towson State) in 1968.

Lacrosse

Towson University
Runk coached Towson men's lacrosse for 31 years. He compiled an overall record of 261–161–0. In 1974, he led the Tigers to the National Championship by defeating Hobart 18–17, making them the College Division National Lacrosse Champions. Towson moved to Division I in 1980 and had continued success with five conference titles in the East Coast Conference. In 1989 they reached their first NCAA Division I Tournament bid. During 1990's Runk led his team to four tournament bids along with an appearance in the national championship in 1991. Throughout his time at Towson, Runk coached a "Player of the Year" in every position, as well as 67 All-Americans.

Hereford High School
After leaving Towson, Runk took over coaching the boys' lacrosse team at Hereford High School in Baltimore County, near his home. In his time at Hereford, the school won the Maryland State Championship in 2003 and 2008 as well as county and division championships in 2008. They qualified for the regional tournament in every year he coached at the school.

Later years
Runk Retired from formal coaching after the championship season with Hereford in 2008. Runk, however, still stays involved with the game as he helps developing programs in Naples, Florida, as well as an annual recruiting camp named Top Star that he hosts for prospective college lacrosse athletes. It is held at Gettysburg College in Pennsylvania.

Runk wrote a book in 2008 entitled "Carl Runk's Coaching Lacrosse: Strategies, Drills & Plays from an NCAA Tournament Winning Coach's Playbook".

Runk now lives with his wife in Parkton, Maryland, and teaches kinesiology courses at Towson University.

Head coaching record

Football

See also
 List of college men's lacrosse coaches with 250 wins

References
 
 

Year of birth missing (living people)
Living people
Arizona Wildcats men's lacrosse coaches
Arizona Wildcats football players
Towson University faculty
Towson Tigers football coaches
Towson Tigers men's lacrosse coaches
High school lacrosse coaches in the United States
People from Parkton, Maryland